Priti Gautam Adani (born 29 August 1965) is an Indian businesswoman, and chairperson of Adani Foundation. With a net worth of over  billion, she is one of the richest women in India.

Early life 
In 1965, Priti Adani was born in Mumbai to a Gujarati family. She completed her bachelor’s degree in dental surgery from Government Dental College, Ahmedabad. She is married to Adani Group chairman Gautam Adani.

Career 

During her early days, Priti Adani started her career as a dentist. In the year 1996, she was appointed as chairperson of Adani Foundation.

In 2001, after the Bhuj Earthquake, she started the Adani DAV School in Mundra. Later, the school was renamed Adani Public School. In June 2009, she and her husband established Adani Vidya Mandir in Bhadreshwar (near Mundra) and Ahmedabad. Adani Vidya Mandir provides free higher secondary education to underprivileged children. Under her leadership, Adani Group's CSR budget for 2018-19 rose to  crore from  crore, in a year's time.

Awards 
 FICCI FLO Women Philanthropist Award (2010–11).
 An honorary doctorate by Gujarat Law Society University.

Personal life 
Priti Adani is married to Gautam Adani, the chairman of the Adani Group. They have two sons - Karan Adani and Jeet Adani.

External links 
Official site

References 

Living people
Priti
Indian industrialists
Indian women philanthropists
21st-century Indian philanthropists
Businesswomen from Gujarat
21st-century Indian businesspeople
1965 births
21st-century Indian Jains
Gujarati people
21st-century industrialists